Protosmia rubifloris is a species of bee in the family Megachilidae. It is found in Central America and North America.

References

Further reading

 
 

Megachilidae
Articles created by Qbugbot
Insects described in 1898